Dewey Crumpler (born 1949) is an American painter and an associate professor at the San Francisco Art Institute. His work has been exhibited nationally and internationally, and is featured in the permanent collections of the Oakland museum of California; the Triton Museum of Art, Santa Clara, California; and the California African American Museum, Los Angeles. Crumpler has received a Flintridge foundation award, National Endowment for the Arts fellowship grant, and the Fleishacker Foundation, fellowship eureka award. A digital image of his murals have been included in the  2017 Tate Modern’s exhibition Soul of a Nation: Art In the Age of Black Power in London.

Education and early life 
Crumpler grew up in Hunters Point, a historically black neighborhood of San Francisco, and attended Balboa High School, an arts magnet school, graduating in 1967. He was involved in Civil Rights activism and showed his work around the city, eventually meeting artist Emory Douglas of the Black Panther Party. Both he and Douglas were part of group of artists who met at Evangeline Montgomery's apartment.

 BFA San Francisco Art Institute, 1972
 MFA, Mills College, 1989
 MA, San Francisco State University, 1974
 Studied Mural Painting, Pablo O’Higgins & David Alfaro Siquieros, Mexico City, 1974
 Balboa High School, SF, CA, 1967

Career 
Seeking advice on a 1974 mural commissioned by the San Francisco Unified School District, a young Crumpler entered Elizabeth Catlett's tutelage, and his life was changed when she connected him with famed muralists José Clemente Orozco, and Pablo O’higgins. Decades later, he appeared on a panel Honoring Catlett at the De Young Museum. Crumpler became a professor of history and studio art at the San Francisco Art Institute where his notable students included Kehinde Wiley and Ionna Rozeal Brown.

San Francisco Art Institute 
Crumpler started teaching at SFAI in 1989 and is an associate professor of painting. One of his former students is Kehinde Wiley, known for painting Barack Obama's presidential portrait.

Work 
Crumpler's work is in the permanent collections of the Oakland Museum of California, the Triton Museum of Art, and the California African American Museum.

Mural at George Washington High School 
In 1936, Russian immigrant Victor Arnautoff was hired by the Works Progress Administration to paint a mural at George Washington High School in San Francisco. His work, Life of Washington, includes images of slavery and settlers stepping over a dead Native American.

Crumpler first saw the mural when he was a Balboa High School student visiting George Washington High School for a football game. He was impressed with the scale of the piece, but initially disliked how the work portrayed African Americans and Native Americans. A few years later, when he was 18 or 19, he was chosen to paint a corresponding mural in response to student activists upset by the Arnautoff work. To prepare for designing the mural, Crumpler traveled to around the country for research, which he was able to do due to his father working for Pan American World Airways. Crumpler viewed different murals and spoke with muralist William Walker. He then went to Mexico and received guidance from artist Elizabeth Catlett. In Mexico, he also met artists Pablo O’Higgins and David Alfaro Siqueiros. After being mentored by O'Higgins, Crumpler came to see Arnautoff's murals as a critique of George Washington, rather than a celebration.

After going through multiple approval processes, Crumpler painted his mural Multi-Ethnic Heritage at the high school. It portrayed Latinos, Native Americans, Asian Americans and African Americans in empowering ways, and included historic figures like Cesar Chavez and Dolores Huerta. He spoke out against the San Francisco School Board's proposed destruction in 2019 of Arnautoff's murals.

Notable exhibitions 
1987 – The Ethnic Idea, curated by Andrée Maréchal-Workman, including Lauren Adams, Robert Colescott, Dewey Crumpler, Mildred Howard, Oliver Lee Jackson, Mary Lovelace O'Neal, Joe Sam, Elisabeth Zeilon, Tom Holland, Celeste Conner, Jean LaMarr, Sylvia Lark, Leta Ramos, Judy Foosaner, Joseph Goldyne, Belinda Chlouber, Carlos Villa, Berkeley Art Center, Berkeley, California
2018 – Collapse: Recent Works by Dewey Crumpler, (solo), Hedreen Gallery, Seattle, Washington

Honors 

 1967 – Honorary Resolution Award, Mayor’s Office, San Francisco, California
 1967 – Honorary Citation, California State Assembly, Sacramento, California
 1969 – Purchase Award, Arts Commission, San Francisco, California
 1975 – Outstanding Achievement Award, National Conference of Artists
 1978–1977 – Purchase Award, Airports Commission, San Francisco, California
 1978–1977 – Purchase Award, Fillmore-Fell Gallery, San Francisco, California
 1985–1982 – Grant Award, California Arts Council, Artist In-Residence Program
 1991 – Honored Artist Award, Pro Art Annual Exhibition, Oakland, California
 1992 – Eureka Fellowship Award, Fleishhacker Foundation, Eureka, California
 1995 – Fellowship Grant Award, National Endowment for the Arts
 2005–2006 – Visual Artist Award, Flintridge Foundation, Pasadena, California

References

External links 
  
 Collapse in Conversation: Artist Dewey Crumpler and Curator Sampada Aranke

Living people
African-American painters
American contemporary painters
African-American contemporary artists
American contemporary artists
American muralists
San Francisco Art Institute faculty
Painters from California
Artists from San Francisco
1949 births
21st-century African-American people
20th-century African-American people